Morris Edwin Martin (March 3, 1929 – July 3, 2014) was an American football coach.  Martin was the 11th head football coach at Dickinson State College—now known as Dickinson State University–in Dickinson, North Dakota and  held that position for three seasons, from 1968 until 1970.  His coaching record at Dickinson State was 10–12–2.

Head coaching record

References

1929 births
2014 deaths
Dickinson State Blue Hawks football coaches